Richard Gore (died 1622) was an English merchant adventurer and  politician who sat in the House of Commons from 1604 to 1611.

Life
Gore was the son of Gerard Gore, an alderman of the City of London. He was auditor from 1601 to 1603. In 1604, Gore was elected Member of Parliament for City of London and sat until 1611.  He was Auditor again from 1606 to 1608.
 
Gore went to live at Hamburg in connection with the merchant adventurers and lived there many years before his death in 1622.

Gore was the brother of Sir John Gore, Lord Mayor in 1624/25, and of  William Gore, alderman and Sheriff in 1615/16.

References

Year of birth missing
16th-century births
1622 deaths
Members of the Parliament of England for the City of London
English MPs 1604–1611